The year 1514 in science and technology included many events, some of which are listed here.

Events
 June 13 – Henry Grace à Dieu, at over 1,000 tons the largest warship in the world at this time, built at the new Woolwich Dockyard in England, is dedicated.
 The following are established at the Cortile del Belvedere in the Apostolic Palace in Rome under the patronage of Pope Leo X:
 Leonardo da Vinci, who concentrates on scientific research.
 Hanno, a white Asian elephant, a gift from King Manuel I of Portugal, which is drawn by Raphael.
 Johannes Werner publishes his translation of Ptolemy's Geography, Nova Translatio Primi Libri Geographicae Cl. Ptolomaei, containing the Werner map projection and proposing use of the cross-staff for marine navigation.

Births
 February 16 – Georg Joachim Rheticus, cartographer and scientific instrument maker (died 1574)
 December 31 – Vesalius, Flemish anatomist "the father of modern anatomy" (died 1564)
 Francisco Hernández de Toledo, physician and botanist (died 1587)

Deaths
 November 28 – Hartmann Schedel, cartographer (born 1440)

References

 
16th century in science
1510s in science